Ins railway station is a railway station in the municipality of Ins, in the Swiss canton of Bern. It is located at the junction of standard gauge Bern–Neuchâtel line of BLS AG and the standard gauge Fribourg–Ins line of Swiss Federal Railways. Aare Seeland mobil also serves the station on its  gauge Biel–Täuffelen–Ins line.

Services 
 the following services stop at St-Blaise-Lac:

 RER Fribourg  / Bern S-Bahn : half-hourly service to 
 Bern S-Bahn:
 : hourly service to Bern.
 : evening service to Bern.

References

External links 
 
 

Railway stations in the canton of Bern
BLS railway stations